Fairest may refer to:
 Fairest (novel), a 2006 fantasy novel by Gail Carson Levine
 Fairest (comics), a monthly Vertigo comic series by Bill Willingham